Belltown Run is a  stream in northern New Castle County, Delaware in the United States.

Course

Belltown Run rises on the Long Creek divide New Castle County, Delaware and flows northeast to meet Muddy Run at Heather Woods.

Watershed
Belltown Run drains  of area, receives about 45.2 in/year of precipitation, has a topographic wetness index of 622.53 and is about 18.0% forested.

See also
List of Delaware rivers

Maps

References

Rivers of Delaware
Rivers of New Castle County, Delaware
Tributaries of the Christina River